Bukvić  is surname found most commonly in Eastern Herzegovina, Croatia, and less commonly in Serbia. It derives from Bukva, which means "beech" in English. The suffix ić is a diminutive designation, or descendant designation. So, the last name can be translated as Beech's son. There are  6,659 documented bearers of this surname. Most bearers in Bosnia and Herzegovina are Serbs and Bosniaks, while in Croatia and Bačka Bunjevci most commonly bear it.
It may refer to:
 (1878-?), Serbian Politician
Amar Bukvić (born 1981), Croatian actor
Amir Bukvić (born 1951), Bosnian actor, playwright and screenwriter
 (1947-2016), Serbian painter
, Croatian literary translator, theorist and critic
Ante Bukvić (born 1987), Luxembourger footballer
Danica Bukvić (born 1951), Serbian politician
Dragomir Bukvić (born 1954), Serbian basketball player and coach
 (1885-1960), revolutionary and trade union activist
 (born 1989), Croatian actor
Milorad Bukvić (born 1976), Serbian footballer
 (born 1979), Serbian actor
 (born 1980), German businessman and former basketball player of Croatian descent
 (born 1991), Bosnian football goalkeeper
Svetozar Bukvić (1958-2020), Serbian politician
 (1927-1992), Croatian socio-political worker

References

See also 

 Bukvići

Bosnian surnames
Croatian surnames
Serbian surnames
Bunjevci